The Minister for Industry and Science is an Australian Government cabinet position which is currently held by Ed Husic in the Albanese ministry since 1 June 2022, following the Australian federal election in 2022.

In the Government of Australia, the minister administers this portfolio through the Department of Industry, Science and Resources.

Scope

 other bodies in the portfolio included:
 Australian Institute of Marine Science
 Australian Nuclear Science and Technology Organisation
 Australian Qualifications Framework
 Australian Research Council
 Australian Skills Quality Authority
 Australian Workforce and Productivity Agency
 CSIRO
 Geoscience Australia
 IP Australia
 National Advisory for Tertiary Education, Skills and Employment
 Office of the Chief Scientist
 Tertiary Education Quality and Standards Agency
The Australian Space Agency opened in Adelaide in February 2020.

List of industry ministers
The following individuals have been appointed as Minister for Industry or any precursor title.

 Morrison was appointed as Minister for Industry, Science, Energy and Resources by the Governor-General on Morrison's advice in April 2021, with both Morrison and Porter holding the position of Minister for Industry until September 2021, and then Morrison and Taylor until May 2022. However, the appointment of Morrison was not made public until August 2022.

List of Ministers for Manufacturing
The following individuals have been appointed as Minister for Manufacturing, or any of its precedent titles:

List of assistant ministers for innovation
The following individuals have been appointed as assistant minister for innovation, or any of its precedent titles:

List of Assistant Ministers for Manufacturing
The following individuals have been appointed as Assistant Minister for Manufacturing, or any of its precedent titles:

List of science ministers
In 1931 and from 1932 to 1937, 1940 to 1949 and 1950 to 1963 there were ministers in charge of the Council for Scientific and Industrial Research and its successors.  In 1963 John Gorton was given responsibility for science (and education) generally.

List of assistant science ministers
The following individual has been appointed as assistant minister for science, or any of its precedent titles:

References

External links
 

History of science and technology in Australia
Australia
Industry and Science
Australia